Sar-e Pol (also known as Sar-e Po) is a village in Kuh Panj Rural District, in the Central District of Bardsir County, Kerman Province, Iran. At the 2006 census, its population was 19, in 5 families.

References 

Populated places in Bardsir County